Olívia Ortiz (born 13 February 1987 in Paris) is a Portuguese actress and television presenter.

Biography 

Started her career as a model in 2009, winner of an international beauty contest in Oxfordshire, UK, and as she became TW Steel luxury watch brand global ambassador. In the two following years this Portuguese beauty queen represented her country in many international contests. 

In 2012, Olívia Ortiz was elected “Musa Triumph” and joined the exclusive set of women, with Cláudia Vieira, Isabel Figueira, Helena Coelho, Andreia Rodrigues e Luísa Beirão, who earned the title of “Musa Triumph” to represent the brand in Portugal.

From 2012 on, she started to appear on television. Hosted the show “GuestList” broadcast by TVI and cast of that channels productions. She got the role of Vanessa Cristina in the soap opera “Destinos Cruzados”, Helena Noronha in the TV show “I Love It” and now, we can see her in “Mulheres” performing as Liliana Neves.

In January 2015 she became host of the show Ora Acerta broadcast live by TVI.

She is sought after for advertising campaigns and has featured on the cover of magazines such as Men's Health, MAXIM e Noivas de Portugal.

Miss Portugal

International beauty pageants 
 Miss TW STEEL world 2010 in the UK - Winner;
 Miss Supranational 2010 in Poland [TOP 20];
 Miss Intercontinental Portugal 2011 in Spain [TOP 15];
 Miss Exclusive of the World Portugal 2011 in Turkey [TOP 5];
 Miss Continent International Tur 2012 in Brazil - Winner.

Filmography

Television

Cinema 
2012 - Psicose (short film)
2012 - Regret - Nuno Madeira Rodrigues (film)
2012 - Não há almoços grátis (short film)

References

External links 
 
 

1987 births
Living people
People from Lisbon
Portuguese beauty pageant winners
21st-century Portuguese actresses
Portuguese film actresses
Portuguese television personalities
Portuguese television actresses